The 2016 IIHF Women's World Championship Division II was three international ice hockey tournaments organised by the International Ice Hockey Federation. The Division II Group A tournament was played in Bled, Slovenia, from 2 to 8 April 2016, the Division II Group B tournament was played in Jaca, Spain, from 29 February to 6 March 2016, and the Division II Group B Qualification tournament was played in Sofia, Bulgaria, from 7 to 10 December 2015.

Venues

Division II Group A

Participants

Match officials
4 referees and 7 linesmen were selected for the tournament.

Referees
 Dina Allen
 Ainslie Gardner
 Tijana Haack
 Debby Hengst

Linesmen
 Magdaléna Čerhitová
 Fu Zhennan
 Jessica Lundgren
 Linnea Sainio
 Gabriela Šťastná
 Olga Steinberg
 Yuka Tochigi

Final standings

Results
All times are local (UTC+2).

Awards and statistics

Awards
Best players selected by the directorate:
Best Goalkeeper:  Nicole Jackson
Best Defenseman:  Lee Kyou-sun
Best Forward:  Katarzyna Frąckowiak
Source: IIHF.com

Scoring leaders
List shows the top skaters sorted by points, then goals.

GP = Games played; G = Goals; A = Assists; Pts = Points; +/− = Plus/minus; PIM = Penalties in minutes; POS = Position
Source: IIHF.com

Goaltending leaders
Only the top five goaltenders, based on save percentage, who have played at least 40% of their team's minutes, are included in this list.

TOI = Time on Ice (minutes:seconds); SA = Shots against; GA = Goals against; GAA = Goals against average; Sv% = Save percentage; SO = Shutouts
Source: IIHF.com

Division II Group B

Participants

Australia announced their intention to withdraw from competition in December, however have changed their plans with the tournament rescheduled for Spain.

Match officials
4 referees and 7 linesmen were selected for the tournament.

Referees
 Sintija Greiere
 Natascha Huizeling
 Zuzana Rimbalová
 Etsuko Wada

Linesmen
 Tatiana Kasášová
 Lee Kyung-sun
 Bente Owren
 İlksen Özdemir
 Tereza Štreitová
 Julia Tschirner
 Sinem Yalçındağ

Final standings

Results
All times are local (UTC+1).

Awards and statistics

Awards
Best players selected by the directorate:
Best Goalkeeper:  Alba Gonzalo
Best Defenseman:  Vanesa Abrisqueta
Best Forward:  Alivia del Basso
Source: IIHF.com

Scoring leaders
List shows the top skaters sorted by points, then goals.

GP = Games played; G = Goals; A = Assists; Pts = Points; +/− = Plus/minus; PIM = Penalties in minutes; POS = Position
Source: IIHF.com

Goaltending leaders
Only the top five goaltenders, based on save percentage, who have played at least 40% of their team's minutes, are included in this list.

TOI = Time on Ice (minutes:seconds); SA = Shots against; GA = Goals against; GAA = Goals against average; Sv% = Save percentage; SO = Shutouts
Source: IIHF.com

Division II Group B Qualification

Participants

Match officials
3 referees and 5 linesmen were selected for the tournament.

Referees
 Elise Rasmussen
 Ramune Maleckienė
 Katarzyna Zygmunt

Linesmen
 Jana Gerkena
 Ingibjörg Hjartardóttir
 Elizaveta Kolchina
 Oksana Shestakova
 Zuzana Svobodová

Final standings

Results
All times are local (UTC+2).

Statistics

Scoring leaders
List shows the top skaters sorted by points, then goals.

GP = Games played; G = Goals; A = Assists; Pts = Points; +/− = Plus/minus; PIM = Penalties in minutes; POS = Position
Source: IIHF.com

Leading goaltenders
Only the top five goaltenders, based on save percentage, who have played at least 40% of their team's minutes, are included in this list.

TOI = Time on Ice (minutes:seconds); SA = Shots against; GA = Goals against; GAA = Goals against average; Sv% = Save percentage; SO = Shutouts
Source: IIHF.com

References

External links
Official website of IIHF

Division II
2016
2016 IIHF Women's World Championship Division II
2016 IIHF Women's World Championship Division II
2016 IIHF Women's World Championship Division II
2016 IIHF Women's World Championship Division II
2016 IIHF Women's World Championship Division II
2016 IIHF Women's World Championship Division II
World
World
World
2016 in Slovenian women's sport
2016 in Spanish women's sport
2016 in Bulgarian women's sport